IESE Business School is the graduate business school of the University of Navarra. Founded in 1958 in Barcelona where its main campus is located, IESE in 1963 formed an alliance with Harvard Business School (HBS) and launched the first two-year MBA program in Europe. IESE has campuses in Barcelona, Madrid, Munich, New York and São Paulo.

As a business school, the different campuses teach Master of Business Administration (MBA), Executive MBA and Executive Education programs. IESE is an initiative of the Opus Dei, a personal prelature of the Catholic Church. In the post-pandemic era, IESE faces new challenges and the necessary shift of the economy towards decarbonisation and reducing inequality, according to its dean, Franz Heukamp.

Chronology
1957: Groundwork for the founding of IESE laid by Professor Antonio Valero.
1958: First Executive Education program launched in Barcelona.
1961: IESE Alumni Association created.
1963: Harvard-IESE Committee set up.
1964: Master of Business Administration program (MBA) established.
1967: IPADE, a business school in Mexico City, created with the assistance of IESE, the first of 15 associated schools established on four continents.
1969: PhD in Management offered.
1974: Executive programs offered in Madrid.
1980: Bilingual MBA program created.
1981: Executive MBA offered in Madrid.
1989: International Advisory Board (IAB) formed.
1991: International Faculty Development Program established to train business professors from around the world.
1994: First international alliances formed, with agreements with the University of Michigan Business School and MIT Sloan School of Management.
1996: Focused Programs, short format programs for senior managers, introduced.
2001: Global Executive MBA offered.
2002: Executive Education program launched in Brazil.
2003: Business Angels Network launched.
2004: New Madrid campus inaugurated.
2005: Executive Education program launched in Munich.
2006: Global CEO Program for China offered by Harvard Business School, CEIBS and IESE. Executive Education program launched in Warsaw.
2007: Offices opened in New York City. Major campus expansion completed in Barcelona.
2007: 50th anniversary.
2009: Global CEO Program for Latin America offered, together with CEIBS and Wharton.
2010: Full New York campus inaugurated. IESE-CEIBS-Wharton Global CEO Program launched.
2012: Executive MBA offered in São Paulo.
2013: 50th anniversary of Harvard-IESE Committee.
2015: New Munich campus inaugurated.
 2019: Master in Management (MiM) launched at Madrid campus, and Executive MBA at Munich campus.
 2021: Expansion of the Madrid campus.
 2022: The new Madrid campus is inaugurated by King Felipe VI.

Internationalization 
Internationalization has formed part of IESE's strategy from its earliest days. 
Beginning in the late 1950s, IESE has sent members of its faculty to doctoral programs in the U.S. and Europe, equipping its professors with an international mindset.  IESE has worked with Harvard Business School for nearly six decades, and in 1964, with the launch of the MBA program, it welcomed the first international students to its Barcelona campus.

IESE has helped to develop a network of 15 associated schools internationally, many of them in the developing world. It has formed long-term academic alliances with schools such as Stanford, MIT and CEIBS, and opened campuses in São Paulo, Munich and New York. Its programs feature work and study opportunities around the globe, and its faculty, staff and students are of more than 100 nationalities.

International Rankings

Campuses

Barcelona 
IESE's main campus is located in the Pedralbes neighborhood of Barcelona, at the foot of the Collserola mountain range. The 52,000 m2 campus features more than a dozen buildings, the newest of which was inaugurated in 2018 to house its research division and doctoral programs. The MBA programs and a wide range of Executive Education programs are offered on the Barcelona campus.

Madrid 
Since its founding in 1974, IESE's Madrid campus has focused on Executive Education programmes -PDD, PDG, PADE-. The Executive MBA is also offered, along with a special program for public sector management. In 2019 the Master in Management (MiM) programme was introduced. The campus is located in Aravaca, on the Cerro del Águila in front of Casa de Campo, in a northeastern suburb of the Spanish capital.The Master building was built in 1991 and extended in 2004. A new campus was opened in 2021: to the original 19,000 m2 a further 16,300 m2 with green spaces and an auditorium have been added.

New York 
IESE opened a campus at 165 West 57th Street in Manhattan in 2007. Housed in a neo-Renaissance building constructed in 1916 as the Louis H. Chalif Normal School of Dancing, IESE's New York campus delivers customized programs for companies and general management programs for executives, with a particular focus on the media and entertainment sectors.

Munich 
IESE's Munich campus, established in 2005, has focused on Executive Education programs for companies and professionals working in Germany and Central Europe. It also offers an Executive MBA program, and courses included in the MBA and Global Executive MBA programs.

São Paulo 
Since 2000, IESE has delivered its Brazil-based activities and programs at ISE Business School, in the Bela Vista neighborhood of São Paulo, home to a number of educational and financial institutions. In addition to general management programs for executives, IESE's São Paulo campus offers an Executive MBA degree.

Associated Business Schools 
IESE's global reach goes well beyond the school's five campuses. IESE has helped establish 15 high-quality business schools, mainly in the developing world,  beginning in 1967 with Mexico's IPADE.  These associated schools are fully autonomous, developed alongside strong and dedicated educators in each of the countries. In addition to IPADE, IESE has played a key role in creating: IAE in Argentina, 1978; PAD in Peru, 1979; AESE in Portugal, 1980; INALDE in Colombia, 1985; IEEM in Uruguay, 1986; LBS in Nigeria, 1991; IDE in Ecuador, 1992; CEIBS in China, 1994; UA&P School of Business Administration in the Philippines,  1995; ISE in Brazil, 1996; ESE in Chile, 1999; MDE Business School in the Ivory Coast, 2003; and SBS in Kenya, 2005.

Programs

Full-time MBA 
The Full-time MBA program includes compulsory subjects in finance, marketing, operations, leadership and self-management, strategy and decision making for managers. These are complemented by a choice of more than 130 electives, and you can also choose to take an overseas module of these electives in different cities on five continents. In addition, the Full-time MBA has an international exchange program to spend a trimester in one of the 30 partner schools.

Learning is through the case method, simulations, teamwork and close interaction with faculty and classmates from around the world. Students in IESE's MBA program can choose to complete the program over 15 or 19 months at the Barcelona campus. It is a full-time, bilingual, on-campus program. Eighty-five percent of the student population is international, coming from 50 different countries, from various professional sectors, with an average age of 29 and four years of previous professional experience. The 2022-23 academic year started with a 40% female student body, until then the highest figure ever.

Executive MBA 
Master's program for managers that can be taken in one of four locations: Barcelona, Madrid, Munich and São Paulo. It has a duration of 18 months in part-time format and can be bilingual (Spanish/English and Portuguese/English) or only in English. The average age of students is 35. IESE's EMBA organizes international elective weeks in Nairobi, New York, São Paulo and Shanghai, as well as an executive management simulation program (EXSIM).

Global Executive MBA 
16-month program for executives that offers a global vision of the challenges and innovations of the business world. It is taught in Barcelona, New York, Munich, Silicon Valley and several cities in Asia. It is structured in six two-week modules taught at the IESE campuses over 12 months, and at least one elective course in another city, concluding the program at IESE's Barcelona campus where, prior to graduation, the projects are presented to the faculty. There are 6 residential modules in different cities (15 days). The profile of GEMBA students is over 35 years old.

Master in Management (MiM) 
With a 11-month course, it is an official full-time Master's program to introduce recent graduates to the world of business. It is taught in Madrid and, through case studies of innovative companies, offers a broad and professional vision of economics, marketing and finance.  The 2022-23 academic year also started with a 40% female student body, until then the highest figure ever.

PhD Program - Doctoral Program in Management Sciences 
Focused on the academic sector for the training of professors and researchers, it is a 4-5 year full-time program taught at the Barcelona campus. It requires a Master's degree in Management Research (MRM) or a postgraduate degree in research methodologies for business and management sciences. It is a 100% scholarship program.

General Management Programs 

 Advanced Management Program (AMP): aimed at senior executives with more than 15 years of senior management experience.  7-month, part-time program offered at IESE campuses in Europe and the Americas.
 Business Acceleration Program (BAP): 5-month part-time program held in Munich.
 Global CEO Program (GCP): 7-month part-time program taught in conjunction with MIT Sloan School of Management. Includes modules in Cambridge (Massachusetts), Singapore and Barcelona.
 Senior Executive Management Program (PADE) - Barcelona, Madrid and Valencia. Part-time 6-month program in Spanish.
 General Management Program (PDG) - 6-month part-time program in Spanish, to be held in Madrid and Barcelona.
 Program for Management Development (PDD) - 6-month part-time program in Spanish, to be held in Barcelona, Madrid, Bilbao, Zaragoza, Santiago de Compostela and Valencia (on-site and virtual).
 Program for Management Development (PMD) - Barcelona and Sao Paulo, 6 months part-time, in English.
 Foundations of Scaling, 6 months, taught to founders of companies and business projects. Delivered in Barcelona, Madrid, Munich and online.
 Digital Transformation. Top Management Program It is face-to-face and in Spanish. It consists of an inaugural session and 3 modules of 3 days, taught in Barcelona and Madrid.

In addition to these main programs, there are:
 Custom Programs
 Focused Programs
 Public Leadership & Government Program

Research

Chairs 
 Abertis Chair of Regulation, Competition and Public Policy
 Alcatel-Lucent Chair of Technology Management
 Anselmo Rubiralta Chair of Strategy and Globalization
 Banco Sabadell Chair of Emerging Markets
 Bertrán Foundation Chair of Entrepreneurship
 CaixaBank Chair of Sustainability and Social Impact
 Carl Schroeder Chair in Strategic Management
 CELSA Chair of Competitiveness in Manufacturing
 Chair of Business Ethics
 Chair of Family-Owned Business
 Crèdit Andorrà Chair of Markets, Organizations and Humanism
 Eurest Chair of Excellence in Services
 Fuel Freedom Chair for Energy and Social Development
 Fundación IESE Chair in Corporate Governance
 Grupo Santander Chair of Financial Institutions and Corporate Governance
 Indra Chair of Digital Strategy
 Jaime Grego Chair in Healthcare Management
 Joaquim Molins Figueras Chair of Strategic Alliances
 José Felipe Bertrán Chair of Governance and Leadership in Public Administration
 Nissan Chair for Corporate Strategy and International Competitiveness
 Novartis Chair on Operational Excellence in the Health Sector
 PricewaterhouseCoopers Chair of Corporate Finance
 Puig Chair of Global Leadership Development
 Schneider Electric Sustainability and Business Strategy Chair
 SEAT Chair of Innovation

Research Centers 
 Center for Business in Society
 Center for Globalization and Strategy
 Center for Innovation Marketing and Strategy
 Center for International Finance
 Center for Public Leadership and Government
 Center for Research in Healthcare Innovation Management
 Entrepreneurship Innovation Center
 Institute for Media and Entertainment
 International Center for Logistics Research
 International Center for Work and Family
 Public-Private Sector Research Center

Governance
IESE's Executive Committee is responsible for the school's long-term strategic development, faculty hiring, investments and program portfolio, as well as the School's operations. The dean of the School presides over the Executive Committee and reports to the president of the University of Navarra.

The School's International Advisory Board (IAB) and the Executive Committee of the IESE Alumni Association provide strategic orientation on IESE's initiatives and governance, as well as offering their advice on educational programs, expansion, investment and corporate involvement.

The US Advisory Council provides the School with support for the long-term development of activities in the United States, particularly the New York campus, and how these activities can be of benefit to IESE in other parts of the world.

IESE and Harvard Business School have had a close relationship for almost 50 years. In 1963, Harvard Business School approved the formation of the Harvard-IESE Committee, a committee established to offer IESE ongoing guidance as it continued to develop its programs and evolve as a business school. The Harvard-IESE Committee helped guide the launch of IESE's full-time MBA program in 1964, the first of its kind in Europe. The committee has met annually ever since in either the U.S. or Europe. The Harvard-IESE Committee has also played a key role in developing IESE-Harvard joint international executive education programs, first launched in 1994.

IESE Business School Deans

International Advisory Board
Created in 1989, the International Advisory Board (IAB) was established to help IESE assess the evolving socioeconomic context in which businesses functions and the latest needs, tendencies and advancements in the field of management and leadership education. The IAB is composed of prominent business and civic leaders from Europe, the United Kingdom, the Americas and Asia who are recognized for their contributions to the development of management and business. The IAB is appointed by the dean and meets periodically to review global developments in humanistic and management issues and discuss challenges and opportunities.

Notable IAB members include Michel Camdessus of the Banque de France, Victor K. Fung of the Li & Fung Group, N.R. Narayana Murthy of Infosys Technologies, Rafael del Pino of Ferrovial, Franck Riboud of Groupe Danone, Martin Sorrell of S4 Capital, Peter Sutherland of BP; Paul Polman of Unilever; Marc Puig of Puig; Denise Kingsmill of IAG; George Yeo of Kerry Group and Kees J. Storm of Aegon.

Alumni 
The first alumni chapter was that of Catalonia, created in 1961. Regional groups for Valencia (Levante), Mallorca (Baleares) and Madrid were established soon after, followed by Aragón (1973), Andalucia (1975), and Galicia, La Rioja, Basque Country and Navarra (1986). The Argentina-Uruguay chapter became the first foreign chapter in 1986; the U.S. alumni chapter was set up in 1987.

IESE's first Global Alumni Reunion was held in Amsterdam in 2000.  Since then, the Global Alumni Reunion has been held in cities around the world, including London, Munich, New York and São Paulo.

In 2021, the Global Alumni Reunion 2021 was held at the expanded Madrid headquarters and was attended by more than 5,000 executives and business people.

Notable alumni
 Juan Antonio Samaranch, Advanced Management Program AMP - 1962, former President of the International Olympic Committee.
 Antonio Brufau Niubó, CEO and Chairman of the multinational oil and gas company Repsol.
 Joan Clos, former mayor of Barcelona.
 Cristina Garmendia, former Minister of Science and Innovation by the Spanish Government.
 Francisco García Paramés, former CEO of Bestinver.
 Manel Guillen, businessman, lawyer and activist investor
 Marek Kamiński, explorer, author and entrepreneur.
 Luis Maroto, MBA 89, CEO Amadeus IT Group.
 Janne Haaland Matláry, Norwegian political scientist, writer, and politician.
 Ibukun Awosika, Chairman First Bank of Nigeria.
 Sheila Mwarangu, civil and structural engineer.
 Vicente Lopez Ibor Mayor, Former Commissioner of the Spanish National Energy Commission.
 Francisco Reynes, MBA 89, President, Gas Natural Fenosa.
 Jorge Moreira da Silva, ex Minister of Environment, Territorial Planning and Energy in Portugal.
 Hans van der Noordaa, has been Chairman and CEO of Retail Division, ING Netherlands and ING Group N.V.
 Miguel Sanz, General Management Program GMP - 1997, Navarre former president of the Government, Spain.
 Paco Ybarra, MBA 87, Global Head of Markets and Securities Services, Citigroup.
 Luis Enrique Yarur Rey,  president, Banco de Crédito e Inversiones (BCI).
 Jeroen Merchiers, managing director, Europe, Middle East and Africa, Airbnb.
 Richard Vaughan, CEO, Vaughan group.
 Steve Shiffman, CEO, Calvin Klein.
 Enrique Ostalé, CEO, Walmart Latin America, India and Africa.
 Yuko Keicho, director of strategy and operations, World Bank Group.
 Ana Maiques, CEO, Neuroelectrics.
 Timo Büetefisch, CEO & founder, Cooltra.
 Fuencisla Clemares, country manager for Spain and Portugal, Google.
 Marta Martínez, general manager, IBM Spain, Portugal, Greece and Israel.
 Helena Herrero, president and CEO, HP Spain and Portugal.
Domingo Mirón, president of Accenture in Spain, Portugal and Israel, and Chief Risk Officer.
Pablo Tovar, senior management coach, fellow of Oxford Leadership.
Cristina García-Orcoyen Tormo, politician.
Camille Villar, politician, Deputy Speaker of the House of Representatives of the Philippines, Member of the Philippine House of Representatives from Las Piñas

References

External links

IESE Website
IESE Open access resources

University of Navarra
Business schools in Spain
Education in Barcelona
Educational institutions established in 1958
1958 establishments in Spain